Rodger Jacobs (March 12, 1959 – July 5, 2016) was an American journalist, writer, author, film producer, columnist, playwright, editor and screenwriter.

Career
Jacobs was a journalist for publications such as Salon, Los Angeles Review of Books, Las Vegas Sun, Eye, Hustler and PopMatters. He also worked for many years as an AVN award-winning adult film industry screenwriter and trade journalist.

In 1999, Jacobs wrote an essay, Running with the Wolves: Jack London and the Cult of Masculinity. In 2010, Jacobs provided the preface for Jack London: San Francisco Stories, an anthology for Sydney Samizdat Press.

Go Irish: The Purgatory Diaries of Jason Miller, a play based on actor Jason Miller, known for the role of Father Damien Karras in the film The Exorcist, that Jacobs co-wrote with Tom Flannery, had its world premiere in 2007 and continues to be displayed in various theatrical venues in Pennsylvania and upstate New York with actor Robert Thomas Hughes, a childhood friend of Jason Miller. Writing in Stage magazine, critic Jack Shaw hailed Purgatory Diaries as "a stirring examination of celebrity madness." Go Irish was performed again in 2015 by Robert Thomas Hughes.

In 2007, Jacobs wrote and directed a live presentation, The Ragged Promised Land, for the Vesuvio Cafe and The Beat Museum in San Francisco to commemorate the 50th anniversary of the publication of Jack Kerouac's On the Road. In 2009, he released Mr. Bukowski's Wild Ride, a collection of original surrealist fiction, for exclusive consignment sale at City Lights Books in San Francisco; writing in the Self-Publishing Review, author Henry Baum cited the book as "another piece to add to (Bukowski's) towering myth … it also gets to the soul of the man … as funny as any of Bukowski's own writing."

Jacobs' controversial series for the Pulitzer Prize-winning Las Vegas Sun, The New Homeless, about Jacobs and his girlfriend Lela Michael and their experiences with homelessness in Las Vegas, elicited praise and commentary from LA Weekly, Witness LA, The Awl and La Presse. The series was also the subject of a three part documentary by Katharine Euphrat featuring Rodger Jacobs and Lela Michael.

Silver Birch Press published Jacobs' original work The Furthest Palm in August 2012. Jacobs describes "Palm" as a series of "heavily autobiographical stories that were woven into the tapestry of a novel", and "postmodern L.A. noir heavily influenced by Raymond Chandler, Leonard Gardner ("Fat City"), and F. Scott Fitzgerald's "The Pat Hobby Stories", as well as Ernest Hemingway's "The Nick Adams Stories."

In December 2012, Jacobs' collection of short fiction and novellas, Invisible Ink (The Book Motel), was lauded as the "most exemplary L.A. book of 2012" by Joseph Mailander in his City Watch L.A. column.

Salon and Los Angeles Review of Books published Jacobs' Franz Kafka themed essay in January 2013 entitled Did Kafka Invent Noir?

Jacobs was also a  film producer best known for being the screenwriter and producer of the 1998 documentary Wadd: The Life & Times of John C. Holmes.

Death
Jacobs died at home on July 5, 2016, in Los Angeles, California.

After learning of Jacobs' death, Jacobs' former girlfriend Lela Michael attempted to preserve his archives yet failed to do so since the two were never married. Lela Michael called off her efforts and died from cancer in Lake County, California on July 28, 2016, twenty-four days after Jacobs' passing.

References

External links

Official website

Rodger Jacobs at PopMatters
Jack London: San Francisco Stories
Jack London: San Francisco Stories Edited by Matthew Asprey, Preface by Rodger Jacobs on Amazon.com
Long Time Money and Lots of Cocaine by Rodger Jacobs on Amazon.com
Mr. Bukowski's Wild Ride by Rodger Jacobs on Amazon.com
The New Homeless: Part 1
The New Homeless: Part 2
The New Homeless: Part 3
The New Homeless documentary: Part 1
The New Homeless documentary: Part 2
The New Homeless documentary: Part 3
Profile of Rodger Jacobs: "À deux doigts de la rue" (Two Fingers From the Street) by Nicolas Berube (La Presse, Canada)
The New Homeless: Rodger Jacobs and the Myth of Solid Ground, Celeste Fremon, Witness LA
The New Homeless: Rodger Jacobs, Part 2 – Moving, Celeste Fremon, Witness LA
Review of "Mr. Bukowski's Wild Ride" by Henry Baum, Self-Publishing Review
Jack Shaw reviews "Go Irish: The Purgatory Diaries of Jason Miller" at Stage Magazine
"Bluebeard in Latex" by Rodger Jacobs, Runner-up in PEN American Center's "PEN Shorts" contest, April 2010

American male journalists
American columnists
American literary critics
American male screenwriters
American male dramatists and playwrights
American alternative journalists
American political writers
American social commentators
American editors
Film producers from California
American male short story writers
American documentary film producers
American bloggers
Writers from San Francisco
1959 births
2016 deaths
20th-century American short story writers
21st-century American short story writers
20th-century American dramatists and playwrights
20th-century American male writers
21st-century American male writers
20th-century American non-fiction writers
21st-century American non-fiction writers
Screenwriters from California
American male bloggers